Lorenzo Lazzari (born 23 August 1974) is a former Italian male middle distance runner who won a bronze medal at the 1999 Summer Universiade.

Biography
Lazzari won four national titles at senior level. In add of this in 1998, establishing his Personal Best with 3:37.00 in 1500 metres, he had reached the 24th place in the seasonal world lists. He also participated at the 2002 IAAF World Cross Country Championships at individual senior level.

Achievements

National titles
He won 5 national championships at individual senior level.
Italian Athletics Championships
1500 metres: 1998, 1999, 2001
Italian Indoor Athletics Championships
1500 metres: 2002

References

External links
 

1974 births
Living people
Italian male middle-distance runners
Athletics competitors of Fiamme Oro
Sportspeople from Bergamo
Universiade medalists in athletics (track and field)
Universiade bronze medalists for Italy
Italian male cross country runners
Medalists at the 1999 Summer Universiade